Mughal Iron & Steel Industries, [] commonly known as Mughal Steel, is a Pakistani steel company which manufactures steel products. 

It is based in Lahore, Pakistan.

History
Mughal Steel was formed in the early 1950 as “Mughal Traders”. The entity then imported Iron and steel products for local consumption.
It was started in 1950 as Mughal Traders imported Iron and steel products.

In 2008, the company acquired the plant and machinery of Al-Bashir Steel Industries.

In 2010, the company was incorporated as Mughal Iron & Steel Industries Limited.

In 2015, the company offered initial public offering and was listed on the Pakistan Stock Exchange.

Financial Performance 
Mughal Iron and Steel posted profit after tax of Rs 593 million for the fiscal year 2020, which resulted in Rs 2.36 earning per share.

References

Steel companies of Pakistan
Manufacturing companies established in 2010
Pakistani companies established in 2010
Manufacturing companies based in Lahore
Pakistani brands
Companies listed on the Pakistan Stock Exchange
2015 initial public offerings